The Principality of Serbia was one of the early medieval states of the Serbs, located in the western regions of Southeastern Europe. It existed from the 8th century up to c. 969–971 and was ruled by the Vlastimirović dynasty. Its first ruler known by name was Višeslav who started ruling around 780. While by that time, starting from the year 680–681, the Bulgarian state had taken the lands to the east. Vlastimir resisted and defeated the Bulgarian army in a three-year-war (839–842), and the two powers lived in peace for some decades. Vlastimir's three sons succeeded in ruling Serbia together, although not for long; Serbia became a key part in the power struggle between the Byzantines and Bulgarians, predominantly allied with the Byzantines, which also resulted in major dynastic wars for a period of three decades. The principality was annexed in 924 by Simeon I and subjected to Bulgarian rule until 927 when Serbian prince Časlav was established as ruler of the Serbian land, and united several Serbian regions, becoming the most powerful ruler of the Vlastimirović dynasty.

An important process during this period was the Christianization of the Serbs, completed by the establishment of Christianity as state-religion in the second half of the 9th century, and followed by the founding of the first Serbian eparchies (dioceses). The principality was annexed by the Byzantines in  969–971 and ruled as the Catepanate of Ras. The main information of the history of the principality and Vlastimirović dynasty are recorded in the contemporary historical work De Administrando Imperio (written  948–949).

Background 

Slavs (Sklavenoi) settled throughout the Balkans during the 6th and the 7th centuries, thus marking the end of the early Byzantine rule in those regions. The history of the early medieval Serbian principality and the Vlastimirović dynasty is recorded in the work De Administrando Imperio (On the Governance of the Empire, abbr. "DAI"), compiled by the Byzantine Emperor Constantine VII Porphyrogenitus (r. 913–959). The work mentions the first Serbian ruler, without a name (known conventionally as "Unknown Archon"), that led the White Serbs to southeastern Europe and received the protection of Emperor Heraclius (r. 610–641), prior to the Bulgar invasion (680). The Serbian ruler was titled "Prince (archon) of the Serbia" (αρχων Σερβλίας). The DAI mentions that this ruler was succeeded by a son, followed by a grandson, and historians generally accept the accounts of DAI on succession of princes from the same family, but their names are unknown until the coming of Višeslav ( 780-800).

Višeslav, Radoslav and Prosigoj (circa 780–830) 

The time and circumstances of the first three Serbian rulers are almost unknown. The first of the dynasty known by name was Višeslav who began his rule around 780, being a contemporary of Charlemagne (fl. 768–814). The Serbs at that time were organized into župe (sing. župa), a confederation of village communities (roughly the equivalent of a county), headed by a local župan (a magistrate or governor); the governorship was hereditary, and the župan reported to the Serbian prince, whom they were obliged to aid in war. According to DAI, "baptized Serbia" (known erroneously in historiography as Raška), included the inhabited cities (καστρα/kastra) of Destinikon (Δεστινίκον), Tzernabouskeï (Τζερναβουσκέη), Megyretous (Μεγυρέτους), Dresneïk (Δρεσνεήκ), Lesnik (Λεσνήκ), and Salines (Σαληνές), while the "small land" (χοριον/chorion) of Bosna (Βοσωνα), part of Serbia, had the cities of Katara (Κατερα) and Desnik (Δέσνηκ). The other Serb-inhabited lands (or principalities) that were mentioned included the "countries" of Paganija, Zahumlje and Travunija, while the "land" of Duklja was held by the Byzantines (it was presumably settled with Serbs as well). Given the large territory, the Serbs most likely arrived as a small military elite which managed to organize and assimilate other already settled and more numerous Slavs. These polities bordered "Serbia" to the north. The exact borders of the early Serbian state are unclear.

Although Višeslav is only mentioned by name, the DAI mentions that the Serbs served the Byzantine Emperor and that they were at this time at peace with the Bulgars, whose neighbors they were and with whom they shared a common frontier. The First Bulgarian Empire, under Telerig, planned to colonize some of their lands with more Slavs from the neighbouring Berziti, as the earlier Bulgar expansion had caused massive Slav migrations and depopulation of Bulgaria — in 762, more than 200,000 people fled to Byzantine territory and were relocated to Asia Minor. The Bulgars were defeated in 774, after Constantine V learned of their planned raid. In 783, a large Slavic uprising took place in the Byzantine Empire, stretching from Macedonia to the Peloponnese, which was subsequently quelled by Byzantine patrikios Staurakios.

Višeslav was succeeded by his son Radoslav, then grandson Prosigoj, and one of these two most likely ruled during the revolt of Ljudevit Posavski against the Franks (819–822); according to Einhard's Royal Frankish Annals, written in 822, Ljudevit went from his seat at Sisak to the Serbs (believed by some historians to have been somewhere in western Bosnia), with Einhard mentioning that for the Serbs "is said to be holding a great part of Dalmatia" (ad Sorabos, quae natio magnam Dalmatiae partem obtinere dicitur).. According to Živković, the usage of the term Dalmatia in the Royal Frankish Annals to refer both to the land where Serbs ruled as well as to the lands under the rule of Croat duke, was likely a reflection of the Franks' territorial aspirations towards the entire area of the former Roman Province of Dalmatia.Though the described borders mark a large area, it is mostly a mountainous and inaccessible terrain, rugged with the high ranges of the Dinarides. Within this region, the Serbs settled only a small, isolated and mutually distant river valleys, karst fields and fertile basins. Those patches of the territory had fertile land, suitable for the agriculture, while the barely accessible, some mountain regions remained uninhabited. Višeslav's great-grandson Vlastimir began his rule during 830s, and he is the oldest Serbian ruler on which there is more substantial data.

Countering Bulgarian expansion (805–829) 
In the east, the Bulgarian Empire grew strong. In 805 Krum conquered the Braničevci, Timočani and Obotrites, to the east of Serbia, and banished their tribal chiefs and replaced them with administrators appointed by the central government. In 815, the Bulgarians and Byzantines signed a 30-year peace treaty, but in 818, during the rule of Omurtag (814–836), the Braničevci and Timočani together with other tribes of the frontiers, revolted and seceded from Bulgaria because of an administrative reform that had deprived them much of their local authority. The Timočani left the society (association, alliance) of the Bulgarian Empire, and sought, together with the Danubian Obotrites and Guduscani, protection from Holy Roman Emperor Louis the Pious (r. 813–840), and met him at his court at Herstal.  The Timočani migrated into Frankish territory, somewhere in Lower Pannonia, and were last mentioned in 819, when they were persuaded by Ljudevit to join him in fighting the Franks. The Danubian Obotrites stayed in Banat, and resisted the Bulgars until 824 when nothing more is heard of them. Krum sent envoys to the Franks and requested that the precise boundary be demarcated between them, and negotiations lasted until 826, when the Franks neglected him. The Bulgars answered by subjugating the Slavs that lived in Pannonia. Then the Bulgars sent ships up the Drava river, and, in 828, devastated Upper Pannonia north of the Drava. There was more fighting in 829 as well, and, by this time, the Bulgars had conquered all of their former Slavic allies.

The Bulgarian Empire had a general policy of expansion in which they would first impose the payment of tribute on a neighboring people and the obligation of supplying military assistance in the form of an alliance (society), leaving them internal self-government and local rulers, and when the need for this kind of relationship expired, they would terminate the self-government of the said people and impose their direct and absolute power, integrating them fully into the Bulgarian political and cultural system.

Vlastimir, Mutimir and Prvoslav (830–892) 

Vlastimir succeeded his father, Prosigoj, in  830. He united the Serbian tribes in the vicinity. The Serbs were alarmed, and most likely consolidated due to the spreading of the Bulgarian Empire towards their borders by the Bulgarian conquest of neighbouring Slavs, and possibly sought to cut off the Bulgar expansion to the south (Macedonia). Emperor Theophilos (r. 829–842) was recognized as the nominal suzerain (overlord) of the Serbs, and most likely encouraged them to thwart the Bulgars. The thirty-year-peace treaty between the Byzantines and Bulgars, signed in 815, was still in effect.

According to Constantine VII, the Serbs and Bulgars had lived peacefully as neighbours until the Bulgar invasion in 839 (in the last years of Theophilos). It is not known what exactly prompted the war, as Porphyrogenitus gives no clear answer; whether it was a result of Serbian-Bulgarian relations, i.e., the Bulgar conquest to the southeast, or a result of the Byzantine-Bulgarian rivalry, in which Serbia was allied with the Byzantines. According to Porphyrogenitus, the Bulgars wanted to continue their conquest of Slav lands and subjugate the Serbs. Presian I (r. 836–852) launched an invasion into Serbian territory in 839, which led to a war that lasted for three years, in which the victorious army of Vlastimir expelled Presian from Serbia; Presian lost a large number of his men, and made no territorial gains. The Serbs had an advantage in the forests and gorges. The defeat of the Bulgars, who had become one of the greater powers in the 9th century, shows that Serbia was an organized state, fully capable of defending its borders, and possessed a very high military and administrative organization. It is not known whether Serbia at the time of Vlastimir had a fortification system and developed military structures with clearly defined roles of the župan. After the victory over the Bulgars, Vlastimir's status rose, and according to Fine he went on to expand to the west, taking Bosnia, and Herzegovina (known as Hum). In the meantime; Braničevo, Morava, Timok, Vardar and Podrimlje were occupied by the Bulgars. Vlastimir married off his daughter to Krajina, the son of a local župan of Trebinje, Beloje, in ca. 847/848. With this marriage, Vlastimir elevated the title of Krajina to archon. The Belojević family was thus entitled to rule Travunia. 

After Vlastimir's death, the rule was divided among his three sons: Mutimir, Strojimir and Gojnik. The brothers defeated the Bulgars once again  853-854, capturing Bulgarian prince Vladimir, son of Boris of Bulgaria. After that, Serbs and the Bulgarians concluded peace. During the following period, the Christianization of the Serbs was completed. By the 870s the Serbs were baptized and had established the Eparchy of Ras (mentioned in the Fourth Council of Constantinople, 878–880), on the order of Emperor Basil I. Mutimir maintained the communion with the Eastern Church (Constantinople) when Pope John VIII invited him to recognize the jurisdiction of the bishopric of Sirmium. The Serbs and Bulgarians adopted the Old Slavonic liturgy instead of the Greek. Sometime after defeating the Bulgarians, Mutimir ousted his brothers, who fled to Bulgaria. He kept Gopnik's son Petar Gojniković in his court, but he managed to escape to Croatia. Mutimir ruled until 890, being succeeded by his son Prvoslav. However, Prvoslav was overthrown by Petar who had returned from his exile in Croatia in  892.

Peter, Pavle and Zaharija (892–927) 

The name Peter suggests that Christianity had started to permeate into Serbia, undoubtedly through Serbia's contacts with the Bulgarians and Byzantines. Peter secured himself on the throne (after fending off a challenge from Klonimir, son of Stojmir) and was recognized by Tsar Symeon I of Bulgaria. An alliance was signed between the two states. Already having Travunia’s loyalty, Peter began to expand his state north and west. He annexed the Bosna River valley, and then moved west securing allegiance from the Narentines, a fiercely independent, pirateering Slavic tribe. However, Peter’s expansion into Dalmatia brought him into conflict with Prince Michael of Zahumlje, who has also grown powerful, ruling the coastal Principality of Zachlumia.

Although allied to Simeon I of Bulgaria, Peter became increasingly disgruntled by the fact that he was essentially subordinate to him. Peter’s expansion toward the coast facilitated contacts with the Byzantines, by way of the strategies of Dyrrhachium. Searching for allies against Bulgaria, the Byzantines showered Peter with gold and promises of greater independence if he would join their alliance - a convincing strategy. Peter might have been planning an attack on Bulgaria with the Magyars, showing that his realm had stretched north to the Sava river. However, Michael of Zahumlje forewarned Symeon of this plan, since Michael was an enemy of Peter, and a loyal vassal of Symeon. What followed was multiple Bulgarian interventions and a succession of Serb rulers.

Symeon attacked Serbia (in 917) and deposed Peter, placing Pavle Branović (a grandson of Mutimir) as Prince of Serbia, subordinate to Symeon (although some scholars suggest that Symeon took control over Serbia directly at this time). Unhappy with this, the Byzantines then sent Zaharija Prvoslavljević in 920 to oust Pavle, but he failed and was sent to Bulgaria as prisoner. The Byzantines then succeeded in turning Prince Pavle to their side. In turn, Zaharija invaded Serbia with a Bulgarian force, and ousted his cousin Pavle in 922. However, he too turned to Byzantium. A punitive force sent by the Bulgarians was defeated.  Thus we see a continuous cycle of dynastic strife amongst Vlastimir’s successors, stirred on by the Byzantine and Bulgarians, who were effectively using the Serbs as pawns. Whilst Bulgarian help was more effective, Byzantine help seemed preferable. Simeon made peace with the Byzantines to settle affairs with Serbia once and for all. In 924, he sent a large army accompanied by Časlav, son of Klonimir. The army forced Zaharija to flee to Croatia. The Serbian župans were then summoned to recognize Časlav as the new Prince. When they came, however, they were all imprisoned and taken to Bulgaria, as too was Časlav. Much of Serbia was ravaged, and many people fled to Croatia, Bulgaria and Constantinople. Simeon made Serbia into a Bulgarian province so that Bulgaria now bordered Croatia and Zahumlje. He then resolved to attack Croatia, because it was a Byzantine ally and had sheltered the Serbian Prince.

Časlav (927–960) 

The Bulgarian rule over Serbia lasted only three years. After Symeon died, Časlav Klonimirović (927- c. 960s) led Serb refugees back to Serbia. He secured the allegiance of the Dalmatian duchies and ended Bulgarian rule in central Serbia. After Tomislav’s death, Croatia was in near-anarchy as his sons vied for sole rule, so Časlav was able to extend his domain north to the Vrbas river (gaining the allegiance of the chiefs of the various Bosnian župas).

During this apogee of Serbian power, Christianity and culture penetrated Serbia, as the Serb prince lived in peaceful and cordial relations with the Byzantines. However, strong as it had grown to be, Serbia’s power (as in other early Slavic states) was only as strong as its ruler. There was no centralized rule, but instead a confederacy of Slavic principalities. The existence of the unified Grand Principality was dependent on the allegiance of the lesser princes to Časlav. When he died defending Bosnia against Magyar incursions sometime between 950 and 960, the coalition disintegrated.

After this, there is a gap in the history of hinterland Serbia (in later western sources: Rascia), as it was annexed by the Byzantine Empire ( 970). The dynasty continued to rule the maritime regions, and in the 990s, Jovan Vladimir rose as the most powerful Serbian prince, ruling over present-day Montenegro, eastern Herzegovina, and northern Albania. This state became known as Duklja, after the ancient Roman town of Doclea. However, by 997, it was made subject to tsar Samuel of Bulgaria.

When the Byzantines finally defeated the Bulgarians, they regained control over most of the Balkans for the first time in four centuries. Serbian lands were governed by a strategos presiding over the Theme of Sirmium. However, local Serbian princes continued to reign as vassals to the Byzantine Emperor, maintaining local autonomy over their lands, while only nominally being Byzantine subjects. Forts were maintained in Belgrade, Sirmium, Niš and Braničevo. These were, for the most part, in the hands of local nobility, which often revolted against Byzantine rule.

Fall and aftermath 

After Časlav died c. 960, the hinterland of Serbia was annexed by the Byzantines and reorganized as the Catepanate of Ras, (971–976). Serbia lost its centralized rule and the provinces once again came under the Empire. Jovan Vladimir emerged later as a ruler of Duklja, a small territory centered in Bar on the Adriatic coast, as a Byzantine vassal. His realm was called Serbia, Dalmatia, Sklavonia, etc., and eventually included much of the maritime provinces, including Travunia and Zachlumia. His realm probably stretched into the hinterland to include some parts of Zagorje (inland Serbia and Bosnia) as well. Vladimir’s pre-eminent position over other Slavic nobles in the area explains why Emperor Basil approached him for an anti-Bulgarian alliance. With his hands tied by war in Anatolia, Emperor Basil required allies for his war against Tsar Samuel, who ruled a Bulgarian empire stretching over Macedonia. In retaliation, Samuel invaded Duklja in 997, and pushed through Dalmatia up to the city of Zadar, incorporating Bosnia and Serbia into his realm. After defeating Vladimir, Samuel reinstated him as a vassal prince. We do not know what Vladimir’s connection was to the previous princes of Serbia, or to the rulers of Croatia—much of what is written in the Chronicle of the Priest of Duklja about the genealogy of the Doclean rulers is mythological. Vladimir was murdered by Vladislav, Samuel’s brother and successor, circa 1016 AD. The last prominent member of his family, his uncle Dragimir, was killed by some local citizens in Kotor in 1018. That same year, the Byzantines defeated the Bulgarians, and in one masterful stroke re-took virtually all of southeastern Europe.

Government 

The Serbian ruler was titled "Prince (archon) of the Serbs" (αρχων Σερβλίας). In Serbian historiography, the Slavic title of knez (кнез) is used instead of the Greek arhont (архонт). The DAI mentions that the Serbian throne is inherited by the son, i.e. the first-born; his descendants succeeded him, though their names are unknown until the coming of Višeslav. The Serbs at that time were organized into župe ( župa), a confederation of village communities (roughly the equivalent of a county), headed by a local župan (a magistrate or governor); the governorship was hereditary, and the župan reported to the Serbian prince, whom they were obliged to aid in war.

Historian B. Radojković (1958) proposed that Serbia was a "divided principality". According to him, Višeslav could have been a chief military leader (veliki vojvoda) who with his company seized the entire power in his hands and turned himself into a hereditary ruler, as Veliki župan; in this way, the first Serbian state was thus established after 150 years of permanent living in the new homeland and existence of military democracy. However, B. Radojković's work was discredited by Sima Ćirković in 1960.

Geography

Cities 

The "small land" (χοριον/chorion) of Bosnia (Βοσωνα/Bosona) was part of Serbia, and had the cities of Katera (Κατερα) and Desnik (Δέσνηκ). The other Serb-inhabited lands (or principalities) that were mentioned in DAI included the maritime Paganija, Zahumlje and Travunija; while maritime Duklja was held by the Byzantines, it was presumably settled with Serbs as well. All of the maritime lands bordered Serbia to the north.

Religion 

The establishment of Christianity as state religion dates to the time of Prince Mutimir and Byzantine Emperor Basil I (r. 867–886), who, after managing to put the Serbs under his nominal rule, sent priests along with admiral Niketas Ooryphas, before the operations against the Saracens in 869 when Dalmatian fleets were sent to defend the town of Ragusa.

The Christianization was due partly to Byzantine and subsequent Bulgarian influence. It is important to note that at least during the rule of Kotsel of Pannonia (861–874), communications between Serbia and Great Moravia must have been possible. The pope was presumably aware of this fact when planning Methodios' diocese. The Dalmatian coast was in Byzantine hands as far north as Split. There is a possibility that some Cyrillomethodian pupils reached Serbia in the 870s, perhaps even sent by Methodius himself. Serbia is accounted Christian as of about 870.

The first Serbian bishopric was founded at the political center at Ras, near modern Novi Pazar on the Ibar river. The initial affiliation is uncertain—it may have been under the subordination of either Split or Durazzo, both then Byzantine. The early church of Saint Apostles Peter and Paul at Ras can be dated to the 9th–10th century, with the rotunda plan characteristic of first court chapels. The bishopric was established shortly after 871, during the rule of Mutimir, and was part of the general plan of establishing bishoprics in the Slav lands of the Empire, confirmed by the Council of Constantinople in 879–880. The Eparchy of Braničevo was founded in 878 (as a continuation of Viminacium and Horreum Margi).

The seal of Strojimir (d. between 880 and 896), the brother of Mutimir, was bought by the Serbian state in an auction in Germany. The seal has a Patriarchal cross in the center and Greek inscriptions that say: "God, help Strojimir (CTPOHMIP)".

Petar Gojniković (r. 892–917) was evidently a Christian prince. Christianity presumably was spreading in his time. Also, since Serbia bordered Bulgaria, Christian influence—and perhaps missionaries—came from there. This would increase during the twenty-year peace. The previous generation (Mutimir, Strojimir and Gojnik) had Slav names, but the following (Petar, Stefan, Pavle, Zaharija) had Christian names, an indication of strong Byzantine missions to Serbia, as well as to the Slavs of the Adriatic coast, in the 870s.

The Bulgarian annexation of Serbia in 924 was important for the future direction of the Serbian church. By then, at the latest, Serbia must have received the Cyrillic alphabet and Slavic religious text, already familiar but perhaps not yet preferred to Greek.

Notable early church buildings include the Monastery of Holy Archangel Michael on Prevlaka, built in the beginning of the 9th century, on the location of older churches of three-nave structure with three apses to the East, dating from the 3rd and 6th centuries, Bogorodica Hvostanska (6th century) and Church of Saints Peter and Paul.

Archaeology 

 Church of Saint Apostles Peter and Paul in Ras
 Sočanica basilica
 Gradina, Sebečevska reka, in Raška
 Gradina Martinića, Zeta
 Gradina, Brsenica, near Sjenica
 Gradina on Jelica, near Čačak
 Gradina on Postenj, near Petar's Church

See also 
 List of Serbian monarchs
 Names of Serbia
 Duklja
 Serbia in the Middle Ages
 White Serbia (before 610)
 Serbian Grand Principality (1091–1217)
 Serbian Kingdom (1217–1345)
 Serbian Empire (1345–1371)
 Fall of the Serbian Empire (1371–1402)
 Serbian Despotate (1402–1459)
 Bulgarian–Serbian wars (medieval)

References

Sources 
Primary sources

 
 
 
 
 
 
 
 
 

Secondary sources

 
 
 
 
 
 
 
 
 
 
 
 
 
 
 
 
 
 
 
 
 
 
 
 
 
 
 
 
 
 
  Google Books

External links

 Steven Runciman, A History of the First Bulgarian Empire, London 1930.
 

 
Serbia in the Early Middle Ages
Medieval Montenegro
Medieval Bosnia and Herzegovina
8th century in Serbia
9th century in Serbia
10th century in Serbia
States and territories established in the 8th century
States and territories disestablished in the 10th century
Former principalities